Lynn Johnston (sometimes credited as Lynn Johnson) is a make-up artist. On January 24, 2012, she was nominated for an Academy Award for the movie Albert Nobbs.

References

External links

Living people
Make-up artists
Place of birth missing (living people)
Year of birth missing (living people)